The 1986 Japan rugby union tour of North America was a series of matches played in May–June 1986 in North America by Japan national rugby union team.

Results

References

Note

Japan
tour
Japan national rugby union team tours
rugby union
rugby union
Rugby union tours of the United States
Rugby union tours of Canada
1986 in American rugby union
1986 in Canadian rugby union